Gale Tattersall (born 1948) is a British filmmaker, cinematographer and founder of the HDD SLR Workshops in Santa Monica, California. He was the cinematographer for such movies as The Commitments and Tank Girl and the director of photography on 120 House episodes. He is currently mentoring upcoming filmmakers on the art of cinematography and film making.

Early life and education
Tattersall's childhood and education were split between the outskirts of Liverpool, England, and boarding school in Darjeeling, India, his father being an engineer at a steel company in Mumbai (then called Bombay).

At the age of sixteen, he left home in Liverpool to make his life in London. The beginnings of his journey to becoming a filmmaker started as a photographer at the Architectural Association School of Architecture in London. A visit by Buckminster Fuller, the renowned American architect and philosopher, in the summer of 1967, caused him to pick up a Bolex camera to document his visit. He became so enchanted by the film making process that he enrolled at the London Film School for its two-year course. At graduation, he received a grant from the British Film Institute to make a short film called Value For Money, inspired by a dream and featuring Quentin Crisp, later to become famous for The Naked Civil Servant.

Awards 
Tattersall has been nominated for the Emmy Award for Outstanding Cinematography for a Miniseries or a Movie for his work on the Ron Howard-produced 1998 docudrama miniseries From the Earth to the Moon. He was twice nominated for the American Society of Cinematographers Award for Outstanding Achievement in Cinematography in Regular Series for the House M.D. episodes "House's Head" and "Meaning".

Personal life 
Tattersall has two grown sons, Rio and Sunny with his Brazilian ex-wife, Teresa.

Filmography

References

External links 
 
 Gale Tattersall Official Website
 Gale Tattersall at HD DSLR Workshops

1948 births
Living people
British cinematographers
Film people from Liverpool
Alumni of the London Film School